Anne Bourg (born 27 April 1987) is a Luxembourgish footballer who plays as a defender and formerly appeared for the Luxembourg women's national team.

Career
Bourg has been capped for the Luxembourg national team, appearing for the team during the 2019 FIFA Women's World Cup qualifying cycle.

References

External links
 
 
 

1987 births
Living people
Luxembourgian women's footballers
Luxembourg women's international footballers
Women's association football defenders